Hrad or gord (archaeology) is a version of the Slavic word meaning castle, and is preserved in the toponymy of numerous Slavic countries:

 Hradec
 Hradec Králové
 Vyšehrad
 Novohrad
 Hradisko 
 Hradiště 
 Uherské Hradiště

Slavic toponyms